The Polish Soviet War was a conflict between the Soviet Russia and Poland from 1919-1920. This article covers the period of the war that took place in 1919.

Following the withdrawal of Germany from Eastern Europe at the end of World War I, conflict began between German-created governments and newly formed local governments. Belarus remained divided with multiple power struggles preventing any central government from holding power. Ukraine especially faced internal strife, with anarchists, communists, White Russians, and Polish soldiers all fighting each other. On November 18, 1918 Vladimir Lenin issued operation Target Vistula to incorporate former Russian territories to the west and support communist movements.

The Soviets maintained an army of over 2 million compared to the Polish half a million. However, most of the Soviet forces were active in the Russian Civil War. The Soviet Western Army began marching westward in early 1919, and the Polish obtained military access through German governed territories to secure the Eastern border. Major conflict did not begin until February, when fighting erupted in Belarus between the Polish and Soviets. With fighting in the Baltic countries and Ukraine engaging both the Soviet Union and Poland, further conflict was imminent. In March, the Polish Army launched an offensive under General Stanisław Szeptycki capturing Slonim and Pinsk with the northern units reaching Lida before stopping for several weeks. 

Polish Chief of State Józef Piłsudski determined to continue the offensive in April and Polish presence in the East was bolstered. The Soviets captured Grodno and Vilnius, but a Polish counteroffensive reversed these victories. With the White Russians gaining an upper hand in the Russian Civil War, Anton Ivanovich Denikin proposed that the Polish could obediently serve in the Russian army, which was seen by the Polish as a rejection of sovereignty. Piłsudski limited the scope of the Polish offensive as to not give either side of the Russian Civil War a decisive advantage.

Throughout the next months, the Polish defeated the Soviets in Lithuania, and captured Minsk by early August. The Soviets withdrew further east, but began strengthening their western border preluding more widespread combat in 1920.

Both sides make efforts towards peace, but little effort was put into it as both nations were planning offensives for the following year. Relations between Poland and Lithuania over the issue of Lithuanian independence worsened after the capture of Vilnius. To the south, a military alliance and an end to the Polish–Ukrainian War was concluded between Poland and Ukraine with both sides turning their attention to the Soviets.

Chaos in Eastern Europe 
In 1918, the German Army in the east was the most powerful force in the region. Even more importantly, it was not only undefeated, but it was also victorious (in contrast to the German Army on the western front). However, the commander of the German forces in the east, Max Hoffmann, a chief negotiator in the Treaty of Brest-Litovsk, was facing increasing difficulties. He believed, rightly, that his army was the only stabilising influence over Eastern Europe. Yet with the disintegration of Austria-Hungary, rise of Bolsheviks in the east and various independent governments between the former frontline and Germany, the former Oberkommando-Ostfront (or Ober-Ost) occupation zone became a thin line to nowhere, connected only to still-German Prussia. The deteriorating situation in Germany, facing the threat of civil war, eventually forced Hoffman to begin to retreat westwards, to Germany, in December 1918. Demoralized officers and mutinous soldiers abandoned their garrisons en masse and returned home. Only a limited number of units still retained any combat strength.

The areas abandoned by the Central Powers became a field of conflict among local governments created by Germany, other local governments that independently sprang up after the German withdrawal, and the Bolsheviks, who hoped to incorporate those areas into Bolshevik Russia. Internal power struggles prevented any of the governments in Belarus from gaining real power. The situation in Ukraine was even more complex, with sizable Ukrainian forces divided and ongoing conflicts among Nestor Makhno's anarchists, the communists, the White Russians, various governments of Ukraine, and the renascent Polish Army. The situation was further complicated when self-defence forces began to form in Lithuania, Estonia and Latvia as well. Many of those groups were fragmented, merged, divided, formed short alliances with others, and almost constantly fought. Almost the entire Eastern Europe was in chaos.

On November 16, Bolsheviks formed the Western Army. On November 18, 1918, Vladimir Lenin issued orders to the Red Army to begin an operation, code named in some sources as Target Vistula. The basic aim of the operation was to drive through eastern and central Europe, institute Soviet governments in the newly independent countries of that region and support communist revolutions in Germany and Austria-Hungary. The Bolshevik Russian forces did not anticipate serious opposition on the way but their advance was slow due to the continuing civil war. Faced with initial struggles with the uncoordinated local opposition and self-defense forces, the Red Army's slow offensive westwards continued through late December 1918. On January 12 Soviet High Command declared the goal of Target Vistula operation: deep scouting towards Neman River. On February 12 that goal was updated to Bug River.

At the start of 1919, fighting broke out almost by accident and without any orders from the respective governments, when self-organized Polish military units in Kresy ("Borderland") areas of Lithuania, Belarus and western Ukraine (the Self-Defence of Lithuania and Belarus numbering approximately ~2,000 soldiers under General Władysław Wejtko) clashed with local communist units and advance Bolshevik forces, each trying to secure the territories for its own incipient government. Eventually, the more organised Soviet forces quelled most of the resistance and drove the remaining forces west.

On January 5, 1919, the Red Army entered Minsk almost unopposed, thus putting an end to the short-lived Belarusian People's Republic. At the same time, more and more Polish and Belarusian self-defense units sprang up across western Belarus and Lithuania. Ill-equipped and mostly comprising local recruits, they were determined to defend their homes from what the newspapers described as a "Red menace." Similar Bolshevik groups operated in the area, and a series of skirmishes ensued. The Polish Army began sending first of their newly organised units east to assist the self-defense forces, while the Russians sent their own units west. Open conflict seemed inevitable.

In the spring of 1919 Soviet conscription produced a Red Army of 2,300,000. However, few of these were sent west that year, as the majority of Red Army forces were engaging the White Russians. In September 1919, the Polish army had 540,000 men under arms, 230,000 of these on the Soviet front.

The Polish government, attempting to stop the westward advance of Russian forces, negotiated on February 2 a treaty with Germany, which allowed Polish units safe passage through the territories still under German administration. Small Polish forces (12 artillery battalions, 12 cavalry regiments, 3 artillery batteries) had been securing the eastern border. The southern sector, from the Pripyat River to the town of Szczytno, was assigned to Grupa Podlaska (the Podlaska Group, later known as Grupa Poleska), commanded by General Antoni Listowski. These units had concentrated near Antopol and moved toward Brest, Pinsk and Bereza Kartuska. The Wolyn region was assigned to Grupa Wołyńska (the Wolyn Group) under General Edward Rydz-Śmigły. 
The northern sector, from Szczytno to Skidel, was protected by Dywizja Litewsko-Białoruska (the Lithuanian–Belarusin Division) under General Wacław Iwaszkiewicz-Rudoszański, concentrated near Volkovysk. That division had also absorbed the former Samoobrona Litwy i Białorusi units which retreated from Vilnius.

By February 14 Polish forces had secured positions along the line of Kobryn, Pruzhany, rivers Zalewianka and Neman. Around February 14, the first organised Polish units made contact with the advance units of the Red Army and a border frontline slowly began to form from Lithuania, through Belarus to Ukraine.

Avalanche starts: First Polish–Soviet conflicts 
The first serious armed conflict of the war took place on February 14. While Soviet units retreated without a fight from the town of Mosty, fighting erupted near the towns of Maniewicze and Bereza Kartuska in Belarus. By late February the Bolshevik offensive had come to a halt, and it had become apparent that the Red Army would not break through the Polish lines with half-hearted attacks. On 27 February 1919, the Soviets proclaimed the creation of the Lithuanian–Byelorussian Soviet Socialist Republic. Both Polish and Soviet forces had also been engaged with the Ukrainian forces (Polish–Ukrainian War). Active fighting was going on in the territories of Baltic countries (Lithuanian Wars of Independence, Latvian War of Independence and Estonian War of Independence). Further escalation of the conflict seemed inevitable.

At the same time, the Russian civil war raged on. In early summer 1919, the White Russians gained an upper hand and White forces under the command of Anton Ivanovich Denikin were marching on Moscow. Piłsudski in his remarks on the war of 1919-20 cited some communication effort between Denikin and the government of Poland, where Denikin stood on a position of allowing the Polish Army into his ranks, "as obedient servants of the Empire", which was understood by the Polish side as a sign that Denikin would not accept Polish independence and wanted to recreate Russia with the complete pre-First World War borders, encompassing Poland. Piłsudski thus decided to temporarily halt the Polish offensive so that the Bolsheviks could concentrate on stopping Denikin. Piłsudski is said to have considered Bolsheviks the less dangerous of the Russian civil war contenders and would offer Poland better terms, as the White Russians were not willing to accept Poland's independence, while the Bolsheviks did proclaim the Partitions of Poland null and void. In the coming months, Denikin would pay dearly for his refusal to compromise on this issue.

In early March 1919, Polish units opened an offensive and forces under General Stanisław Szeptycki captured the cities of Słonim (March 2) and crossed the Neman River. Forces under General A. Listowski took Pinsk (March 5) and secured passages through Jasiolda river and Oginski Canal. Northern units reached the outskirts of Lida and stopped for several weeks. Polish decisions regarding further action in the east were taken at the beginning of April when Józef Piłsudski determined that Polish forces must maintain the initiative on the eastern front but should avoid tipping the balance of Russian Civil war in any direction. Both the Russian and Polish advances began around the same time in April, resulting in increasing numbers of troops being brought into the area. In April the Bolsheviks captured Grodno and Vilnius, but in the very same month was pushed out by a Polish counteroffensive. The newly formed Polish Army had proved to be a far more difficult opponent than the Russians had assumed. Although the Soviet orders for Operation Target Vistula (advance west) were never rescinded, the early Russian plans would soon be made obsolete by growing Polish resistance and eventually, in April, a Polish counteroffensive. Unable to accomplish its objectives and facing strengthening offensives of White Russians, the Red Army withdrew from their positions and reorganized. Soon the Polish-Bolshevik War would begin in earnest.

Polish forces under General J. Lasocki recaptured Lida April 17. General A. Mokrzecki captured Nowogródek and Baranowicze on April 18. On April 19 the major city of Vilnius was taken by Polish cavalry units under Władysław Belina-Prażmowski (~800 soldiers), soon reinforced with infantry under z-Śmigły (1 Dywizja Legionów, ~2,500 soldiers), who swiftly defeated the Red Army units remaining near Vilnius (near Pabradė, Ašmena and Širvintos). By May units of Rydz-Śmigły had advanced to the north and east and reached the line of Łyngmiany–Ignalino–Hoduciszki–Narocz lake, while General Mokrzecki engaged Russians east of Baranowicze and General Listowski moved west of Łunińc and near lower Styr on the Polesie Wołyńskie.

On 1 July Polish armies attacked Mołodeczno, captured on 4 July; Łuniec in the Polesie region was captured on 10 July, and in mid-July, the Soviet counteroffensive near Naliboki was stopped. Polish forces continued their push and on 8 August captured Minsk. From 17 July Polish forces pushed towards Zbrucz and on 9 August captured Dubno and Krzemieniec in the Wołyń region. On 13 August the town and fortress of Równe had been captured, on 16 August Ostroróg near Horyń, on 18 August Zasław, and on 30 August Olewsko near Uborcia. In the Lithuanian–Belarusian theater of operations Ihueń was captured on 14 August, Borysów at Berezyna on 20 August and on 25 August an offensive towards Połock and Dyneburg was launched. On 28 August Polish forces for the first time used tanks and after heavy fighting captured fortress Bobrujsk near Berezyna (29 August), and from October landed on the other side of the river (Bobrujsk on 1 October, Borysów on 11 October). On 2 October Polish forces reached Daugava River and secured the region from Dzisna to Dyneburg.

Until early 1920, the Polish offensive was quite successful. Sporadic battles erupted between Polish forces and the Red Army, but the latter was preoccupied with the civil war and White Russian counterrevolutionary forces and were slowly but steadily retreating on the entire western frontline, from Latvia in the north to the Ukraine in the south.

Diplomatic front, Part 1: Alliances
In 1919, several attempts at peace negotiations had been made by various factions, but to no avail. The first attempt at Polish-Soviet negotiations took place in Białowieża from June–August 1919. None of these was successful, and the war raged on. With White Russian general Denikin unwilling to guarantee Polish independence, Polish negotiators initiated another round of negotiations with the Bolsheviks, from October until December 1919 in Moscow and Mikaszewicze (in Polesie). While the negotiations slightly slowed down the pace of conflict between Poles and Bolsheviks, this mostly allowed Bolsheviks to concentrate bulk of their forces on destroying Denikin's army advancing towards Moscow. The negotiations in early 1920 would be considered a token effort by both sides, which were preparing for a major offensive.

In the meantime, Polish–Lithuanian relations worsened as Polish politicians found it hard to accept Lithuanians demand for complete independence and their territorial demands, especially on ceding the city of Vilnius, the Lithuanian historical capital which had a Polish ethnic majority. Thus Lithuanian nationalist leaned more and more towards the Soviet side. Polish negotiators made some more progress in negotiations with the Latvian Provisional Government, and in early 1920, Polish and Latvian forces were conducting some joint operations against Soviets.

The main Polish success was concluding signing a military alliance with the Ukrainian People's Republic of Symon Petliura. Ukrainians, who had faced a series of defeats on hands of both Poles and Soviets, decided that the only way to preserve some form of independence was to ally themselves with one faction and majority of Ukrainian leaders chose Poland as the less imperialistic of their enemies. Petliura had, after his government's defeat by the Bolsheviks, found asylum in Poland and now headed a new Ukrainian Army. The Polish–Ukrainian War ended around July 1919 and from September both Polish and Ukrainians fought together against the Soviets.

References

See also
 Polish–Soviet War#References

Conflicts in 1919
1919 in Poland
Polish–Soviet War